Francisco Daniel Rivera Sánchez, MSpS (15 October 1955 – 18 January 2021) was a Mexican Catholic auxiliary bishop.

Biography
Rivera Sánchez was born on 15 October 1955 in Guadalajara, Jalisco, and was ordained to the priesthood in 1988.

He served as titular bishop of Aradi and as auxiliary bishop of the Roman Catholic Archdiocese of Mexico City from 2020 until his death on 18 January 2021 from COVID-19 in Mexico City during the COVID-19 pandemic in Mexico.

Notes

1955 births
2021 deaths
21st-century Roman Catholic titular bishops
21st-century Roman Catholic bishops in Mexico
Deaths from the COVID-19 pandemic in Mexico